This is a list of the languages spoken on the shores of the North Sea. The majority are in the Germanic sub-family of Indo-European languages. In addition, French (a Romance language) and Scottish Gaelic (a Celtic language) are used in certain regions.

North Germanic languages

 Danish
 Norwegian

West Germanic languages

Anglo-Frisian languages

 English language
 English English
Essex dialect
 Estuary English
Geordie
 Highland English
Mackem
 Norfolk dialect
Suffolk dialect
 Scottish English
 Yorkshire dialect and accent
 Frisian languages
 North Frisian
 West Frisian
 Scots language
 Doric
 Northern Scots
 Orcadian dialect
 Shetland dialect

High German languages

 Standard German
 Yiddish

Low Franconian languages

 Dutch
 Brabantian
 Hollandic
 Zeelandic
 West Flemish

Low German
 Low German

Romance languages
 French

Celtic languages
 Scottish Gaelic

Extinct languages

 Old Norse (North Germanic).  This evolved into the modern North Germanic language group, of which most except for Norn still survive.
 Norn language.  This was spoken in the Orkney and Shetland islands but was replaced by English/Scots in the 18th and 19th centuries.  The last speaker died in the 19th century.
 Pictish language (Celtic). Was spoken in wha is now Scotland in the early Middle Ages by the Picts. It was replaced by Scottish Gaelic and Old Norse in the 9th and 10th centuries.
  Old Brythonic language (Celtic) was spoken in Britain in the Iron Age, the Roman Era and the Sub-Roman Period. It was replaced by the Germanic dialects of the Anglo-Saxon invaders that would later be Old English.

North Sea
North Sea
North Sea
Europe-related lists